"My Country" is a poem about Australia written by Dorothea Mackellar.

My Country may also refer to:
 My Country: The New Age, a 2019 South Korean television series 
 My Country (1986 film), an Australian film
 My Country (2011 film), a Brazilian drama film

Music 
 My Country (album), a 1968 album by George Jones
 "My Country" (Midnight Oil song)
 "My Country" (Roger Taylor song)
 Má vlast or My Country, a set of six symphonic poems composed by Bedřich Smetana